Jon Skrypnyk (born July 17, 1981) is a Canadian professional wrestler, best known by his ring name Jon Cutler. He had been signed to a developmental contract with World Wrestling Entertainment and worked in their developmental territory, Florida Championship Wrestling in 2008 and 2009.

Career

Starting out
A native of Selkirk, Manitoba, Cutler while in his early 20s approached local Selkirk promoter and wrestler Matt Evans, he who agreed to train him and later booked him on shows in Winnipeg. He later received more advanced training from Johnny Devine.

Debut
He made his professional debut on May 30, 2002, and wrestled in Manitoba and Saskatchewan during his early career. He also appeared in British Columbia and Ontario and toured the United States. In 2003, he was invited to attend a first-ever week-long Ohio Valley Wrestling camp. Winning the BSW Heavyweight Championship in Body Slam Wrestling shortly after, he also began regularly appearing in the Canadian Wrestling Federation and Premier Championship Wrestling.

On September 11, 2004, Cutler appeared on the first event held by Power Slam Entertainment, PSE Genesis, at the Selkirk War Memorial Hall including "The Mecca" Shane Madison, Shaun Houston, "The Outlaw" Adam Knight, Matt Fairlane and Chris Raine. The event also raised money for local charities including the Selkirk Food Bank and the Ruth Hooker breakfast program. Winning the PSE Heavyweight Championship at that show, he defended his title at the promotion's second show, PSE Revolution, against Chris Raine the following month.

In October 2005, he also appeared on the supercard Halloween Horror for Action Wrestling Entertainment, facing Adam Knight in the main event. During that year, he appeared on the promotion's television show AWE Overload, later released on DVD as AWE: Larger Than Life, Volume 2.

On March 2, 2007, at the Glenwood CC in Winnipeg, Manitoba, Canada; "Prime Time" Jon Cutler pinned EZ Ryder in the main event for Reckoning Day to become the new RME Heavyweight Champion. He last defended the title on July 4, 2007 at RME's Maple Leaf Mayhem Tour at the Dryden Recreation Complex in Dryden, Ontario, Canada where he pinned Vance Nevada to remain the RME Heavyweight Champion. In October 2007, Cutler vacated the title.

World Wrestling Entertainment (2008)
Cutler made his first WWE appearance on the May 5 episode of WWE Raw at the Air Canada Centre in Toronto, Ontario, where he was defeated by Paul Burchill and Katie Lea Burchill in a handicap squash match.

On July 10, 2008, Jon Cutler lost to PCW Heavyweight Champion Kenny Omega. Cutler had previously won a tournament defeating "Outlaw" Adam Knight, Antonio Scorpio, Jr. and Mike Angels to win a title shot against Omega. Four days later, he faced Marius at a Steeltown Pro Wrestling event which raised money for the local Selkirk soup kitchen.

Florida Championship Wrestling (2008-2009)
After signing a contract with WWE, he began to appear for Florida Championship Wrestling (FCW), WWE's developmental territory. He teamed with Dylan Klein until his release in June 2009.

Wrestling Fan Xperience (2010-present)
After his dismissal from WWE, Cutler returned to Winnipeg where he is currently wrestles for WFX Wrestling (WFX).  Here he is now a part of a tag team known as 'Hollywood Love Guns'. The team includes himself (with the nickname of 'Prime Cut'), 'Mr.Pec-Tacular' Jessie Godderz (formerly of Big Brother) and their manager Jonny Fairplay (formerly of Survivor).

Other media
Apart from his wrestling career, Cutler has also appeared at the Winnipeg Fringe Festival in 2007 in the play Grudge Match, written by Primrose Madayag Knazan and Josh Knazan, set in the world of Pro Wrestling and also featuring "The Outlaw" Adam Knight, "Hotshot" Danny Duggan and actor Josh Knazan.

In wrestling
Finishing moves

Heat-Seeking Elbow (Diving elbow drop)
Signature moves
Boston crab
Spear

Championships and accomplishments
Body Slam Wrestling
BSW Heavyweight Championship (1 time)

Power Slam Entertainment
PSE Heavyweight Championship (1 time)

Ring Masters Entertainment
RME Heavyweight Championship (1 time)

References

1981 births
Living people
Canadian male professional wrestlers
Professional wrestlers from Manitoba
Sportspeople from Selkirk, Manitoba
Sportspeople from Winnipeg
21st-century professional wrestlers